The Alliance for Healthy Cities (AFHC) is a cooperative international alliance aimed at protecting and enhancing the health and health care of city dwellers. It is composed of groups of cities, urban districts and other organizations from countries around the world in exchanging information to achieve the goal through a health promotion approach called Healthy Cities. The chair city for the alliance is Ichikawa, Japan.

The alliance and its members work in favour of the healthy city, defined by the World Health Organization (WHO) as "one that is continually creating and improving those physical and social environments and expanding those community resources which enable people to mutually support each other in performing all the functions of life and in developing to their maximum potential".

History 

The first international declaration that promoted the concepts underlying healthy cities, the Alma Ata Declaration, was adopted at the International Conference for Primary Health Care, jointly convened by the WHO and UNICEF in Almaty (formerly Alma-Ata), presently in Kazakhstan, 6–12 September 1978. The primary health care strategy endorsed and targeted health for all the people of the world by the year 2000.

Various discussions have taken place since then. Trevor Hancock and Leonard Duhl promoted the term "Healthy Cities" in consultation with the WHO:
Economic development has brought comfort and convenience to many people in the industrialized world, but in its wake are pollution, new health problems, blighted urban landscapes and social isolation. Growing numbers of the dispossessed are also being left on the sidelines as the disparity between rich and poor grows. In an effort to remedy these ills, people from disparate backgrounds in thousands of communities are joining together with government agencies under the Healthy Cities/Healthy Communities banner to improve the quality of life in their towns and cities.

At the First International Conference on Health Promotion in 1986, the Ottawa Charter for Health Promotion was adopted that presented actions to achieve healthy life for all people by the year 2000 and beyond.

Following a second international conference on health promotion at Adelaide in 1988 and a third at Sundsvall in 1991, and twenty years after the Alma Ata Declaration, the Fourth International Conference on Health Promotion held in July 1997 in Jakarta adopted the new Jakarta Declaration: "New Players for a New Era - Leading Health Promotion into the 21st Century". It came at a critical moment in the development of international PHC strategies.

Timeline
 17 October 2003: First organizational meeting held in Manila; participants of the inaugural meeting were cities, national coordinators, NGOs, and academic institutions engaged in the Healthy Cities program worldwide.
 12–14 October 2004: The Alliance held its inaugural General Assembly and Conference in Kuching, with city mayors, governors, city officers, public health and urban planning professionals, NGOs, academic institutions, and national and international leaders to celebrate the inauguration of the Alliance for Healthy Cities.
 28–30 October 2006: The Second General Assembly and Conference in Suzhou, with the theme Healthy Cities in the Globalizing World.
 23–26 October 2008: The third global conference of the Alliance for Healthy Cities was held in Ichikawa with the theme of "Health Security in the City: Healthy Cities activities building a better future".
 21–22 July 2009: AFHC International Forum was in Hue.
 October 2009: The fourth global conference was held in Gangnam-gu, South Korea

List of members

Australia 
 City of Casey
 Corio and Norlane Development Advisory Board
 City of Gold Coast
 Illawarra (Wollongong and Shellharbour)
 Municipality of Kiama
 Logan City
 City of Marion
 City of Townsville

Cambodia 
 Phnom Penh

People's Republic of China 
 Central and Western District, Hong Kong
 Changshu
 Huai'an
 Islands District, Hong Kong
 Kowloon City District, Hong Kong
 Kunshan
 Kwai Tsing District, Hong Kong
 Kwun Tong District, Hong Kong
 Luohu District
 Macau
 North District, Hong Kong
 Sai Kung District, Hong Kong
 Sha Tin District, Hong Kong
 Southern District, Hong Kong
 Suzhou
 Taicang
 Tai Po District
 Tongzhou, Jiangsu
 Tsuen Wan District, Hong Kong
 Wujiang, Jiangsu
 Yau Tsim Mong District, Hong Kong
 Zhangjiagang

Japan 
 Abashiri, Hokkaido
 Abiko, Chiba
 Aisai, Aichi
 Ama, Aichi
 Fujieda, Shizuoka
 Fukuroi, Shizuoka
 Hamamatsu, Shizuoka
 Ichikawa, Chiba
 Izumisano, Osaka
 Kameyama, Mie
 Kasama, Ibaraki
 Kashiwa, Chiba
 Kitanagoya, Aichi
 Kobe
 Minokamo, Gifu
 Miyakojima, Okinawa
 Myōkō, Niigata
 Nagareyama, Chiba
 Nagoya
 Nagakute, Aichi
 Nishitokyo, Tokyo
 Obihiro, Hokkaido
 Ōbu, Aichi
 Osaki, Miyagi
 Owariasahi, Aichi
 Seiyo, Ehime
 Shikokuchūō, Ehime
 Suita, Osaka
 Tahara, Aichi
 Taitō, Tokyo
 Tajimi, Gifu
 Takamatsu, Kagawa
 Toon, Ehime
 Yamato, Kanagawa
 Yawatahama, Ehime

South Korea 
 Andong
 Asan
 Buk-gu, Ulsan
 Busan
 Busanjin-gu, Busan
 Buyeo County
 Changwon
 Chuncheon
 Dobong-gu
 Dong-gu, Gwangju
 Donghae City
 Dongjak-gu
 Gangdong-gu
 Gangnam-gu
 Geumsan
 Guro-gu
 Gwangjin-gu
 Gwangmyeong
 Hadong
 Hwaseong, Gyeonggi
 Jangheung
 Jangsu
 Jecheon
 Jeju-do
 Jeonju
 Jincheon
 Jinju
 Jung-gu, Seoul
 Muju County
 Nam-gu, Gwangju
 Namhae
 Seocho-gu
 Seodaemun-gu
 Seo-gu, Gwangju
 Seongbuk-gu
 Seongdong-gu
 Seosan
 Seoul
 Sokcho
 Songpa-gu
 Siheung
 Suncheon, Jeollanam-do
 Taebaek
 Uiwang
 Wando
 Wonju
 Yanggu, Gangwon
 Yangpyeong
 Yangsan
 Yeongdeungpo-gu
 Yeongi
 Yongsan-gu

Malaysia 
 Kuching

Mongolia 
 Ulan Bator

Netherlands 
 Rotterdam

Philippines 
 Caloocan
 Dagupan
 Las Piñas
 Makati
 Marikina
 Muntinlupa
 Pasig
 Parañaque
 San Fernando City, La Union
 Tagaytay
 Valencia City, Bukidnon

Vietnam 
 Huế

See also 
 Primary health care
 Alma Ata Declaration
 Health promotion
 Ottawa Charter for Health Promotion
 Jakarta Declaration
 Public health
 UNICEF

References

External links 
 The Alliance for Healthy Cities official Home page

World Health Organization
Organizations established in 2004
Public health organizations
Health promotion
International medical and health organizations
Non-profit organizations based in Japan